Bronisław Szlagowski (born 23 January 1938) is a Polish retired professional footballer who played as a midfielder. He started his career in Poland with Lechia Gdańsk before spending the rest of his career in Germany, where he was known as Horst Schlagowski.

Career
Szlagowski was born in Pruszcz Gdański in the Free City of Danzig in 1938. He started his playing career with a local team, Lechia Gdańsk. In his debut season he made 11 top flight appearances and scored six goals. Szlagowski's six goals in 11 games, a ratio of 0.55 goals per game is still a Lechia record for goals per game in the top division, with his hat-trick against Zagłębie Sosnowiec in a 5–0 win was the clubs first in the top division.

In September 1957 Szlagowski moved to Germany, starting with playing for Werder Bremen. After a season with Werder Bremen, Szlagowski joined Rot-Weiß Oberhausen for two seasons. During this time he made 49 league appearances and scored 25 goals, including scoring four in one match against Alemannia Aachen. Szlagowski then joined FSV Frankfurt for a season, notably scoring in a 4–1 win over Bayern Munich. Szlagowski went on to have short stints with FC St. Pauli, Wormatia Worms and Holstein Kiel before retiring after his second spell with Rot-Weiß Oberhausen.

References

1938 births
Living people
People from Pruszcz Gdański
Sportspeople from Pomeranian Voivodeship
Polish footballers
Association football midfielders
Lechia Gdańsk players
SV Werder Bremen players
Rot-Weiß Oberhausen players
FSV Frankfurt players
FC St. Pauli players
Wormatia Worms players
Holstein Kiel players
Polish expatriate footballers
Polish expatriate sportspeople in Germany
Expatriate footballers in Germany